Bánh da lợn or bánh chín tầng mây or bánh da heo is a Vietnamese steamed layer cake made from tapioca starch, rice flour, mashed mung beans, taro, or durian, coconut milk and/or water, and sugar. It is sweet and gelatinously soft in texture, with thin (approximately 1 cm) colored layers alternating with layers of mung bean, durian, or taro filling.

Typical versions of bánh da lợn may feature the following ingredients:
Pandan leaf (for green color) with mung bean paste filling
 Pandan leaf (for green color) with durian filling
Lá cẩm (leaf of the magenta plant, Peristrophe roxburghiana; imparts a purple color when boiled) with mashed taro filling

In modern cooking, artificial food coloring is sometimes used in place of the vegetable coloring.

A cake called kuih lapis, which is made in Malaysia and Indonesia, is similar to bánh da lợn. In the Philippines, a similar dessert and variant of kutsinta is simply called Vietnamese kutsinta and the Khmer of Cambodia called num chak chan (នំចាក់ចាន់).

See also
Pandan cake
Bánh đúc
Kutsinta
List of steamed foods

Notes

External links
Photo of bánh da lợn (the green cake in the center)
Photo of bánh da lợn
Alice's Guide to Vietnamese Banh

Steamed foods
Layer cakes
Rice cakes
Legume dishes
Bánh
Cassava dishes
Vietnamese desserts